Nannoryctes sulcaticeps is a species of beetle in the family Carabidae, the only species in the genus Nannoryctes.

References

Scaritinae